Tax protesters in the United States advance a number of conspiracy arguments asserting that Congress, the courts and various agencies within the federal government—primarily the Internal Revenue Service (IRS)—are involved in a deception deliberately designed to procure from individuals or entities their wealth or profits in contravention of law.  Conspiracy arguments are distinct from, though related to, constitutional, statutory, and administrative arguments.  Proponents of such arguments contend that all three branches of the United States government are working covertly to defraud the taxpayers of the United States through the illegal imposition, assessment and collection of a federal income tax.

Conspiracy arguments in general
Tax protester Irwin Schiff, following his criminal conviction for tax fraud that resulted in the imposition of a 13-year prison sentence, released a statement asserting in part that "the entire federal judiciary is involved in a monumental, criminal conspiracy to collect income taxes in violation of law". Schiff's web site continues to state: "Since the income tax was repealed in 1954 when Congress adopted the 1954 Code, it is clear that for 50 years federal judges in conspiracy with U. S. Department of Injustice  prosecutors have been illegally and criminally prosecuting people for crimes that do not exist in connection with a tax that nobody owes."

One tax protester web site, called www.tax-freedom.com, quotes from an article by William Cooper titled "BATF/IRS - Criminal Fraud", from the publication Veritas (issue no. 6, September 1995), as follows:

Claims made in support of the income tax conspiracy include:
The courts rely only on the many cases where tax protesters lost, and ignore those few where tax protesters prevail.
The gold fringe around the United States flag, as displayed in all courts, designates them as admiralty courts, which cannot hear other kinds of cases, or signal that the court is operating under maritime law.  No court has ever upheld this argument, as neither the presence (or absence) of a flag (or of any other standard or element of decor), nor the fringe on a flag (which has no heraldic or vexillological significance), has any bearing whatsoever on the jurisdiction of a court. In United States v. Greenstreet, the United States District Court for the Northern District of Texas noted:

"Capital letters" argument

Some tax protesters (and occasionally persons brought before courts<ref>United States v. Stinson, Dist. Court, WD Oklahoma 2005 - Google Scholar United States v. Stinson (2005)]. Retrieved Jul 2013.</ref>) have argued that because the titles of court cases identify the parties in all capital letters, the persons thus identified are "fictitious entities". In other words, a court hearing a case titled "STATE v. JOHN Q. SMITH" has no authority over the defendant, "John Q. Smith", because the capitalization of the name means the court is addressing a person who does not exist. Such an argument was made by Eddie Ray Kahn, a co-defendant of Wesley Snipes in the latter's high-profile tax evasion case. Kahn "made several missteps and peculiar motions. For example, he sought to be immediately freed because the indictment lists his name in all capital letters, and he claimed U.S. attorneys have no jurisdiction because Florida supposedly was never ceded to the federal government". The court denied these motions.

No court has ever upheld such an argument. See, e.g. United States v. Frech ("Defendants' assertion that the capitalization of their names in court documents constitutes constructive fraud, thereby depriving the district court of jurisdiction and venue, is without any basis in law or fact"); United States v. Washington ("defendant contends that the Indictment must be dismissed because 'KURT WASHINGTON,' spelled out in capital letters, is a fictitious name used by the Government to tax him improperly as a business, and that the correct spelling and presentation of his name is 'Kurt Washington.' This contention is baseless"). See also United States v. Ford (taxpayer's argument—that an IRS summons was invalid because the IRS capitalized all the letters in the taxpayer's name in the caption of a petition—was ruled to be frivolous). Similar arguments have been raised unsuccessfully about things such as the presence or absence of punctuation, or of a middle name or middle initial, or of unusual punctuation such as hyphenation peculiarly used by the party using the argument.

Conspiracy theory regarding government employees and tax forms
One group, calling itself "We the People", has stated that government personnel are engaged in a conspiracy in connection with Federal tax forms and "OMB [Office of Management and Budget] control numbers" in connection with a criminal tax case involving a tax protester:

Conspiracy arguments involving Zionism and Freemasonry
One convicted tax protester, Edward Lewis Brown, has charged that law enforcement officials who surrounded his property in a standoff over his refusal to surrender after his conviction were part of a "Zionist, Illuminati, Free Mason  movement", and that the federal government had no jurisdiction in New Hampshire. The New Hampshire Union Leader also reported that "the Browns believe the IRS and the federal income tax are part of a deliberate plot perpetrated by Freemasons to control the American people and eventually the world."

In an interview on February 2, 2007, on the radio show Constitution for the Defense, Ed Brown said:

The standoff between Brown and law enforcement officials ended with his imprisonment after his arrest in October 2007.

Arguments about money
Some protesters have argued that Federal Reserve notes (better known as dollar bills) are not actually money, because the Constitution only permits the government to "coin" money, and requires that such money be exchangeable for gold or silver; therefore, printed bills are instead symbols for use in bartering, and being paid in dollars is not the receipt of taxable income.  This argument was brought before a court in Wilson v. United States. The court responded:

Other occasionally encountered arguments from tax protesters include the notion that U.S. currency is valueless or unauthorized by the Constitution because the currency is fiat money untied to the gold standard. No court has upheld the validity of that argument.

The argument that Federal reserve notes are not taxable income when paid to a taxpayer because the notes are not gold and silver and may not be redeemed for gold and silver, and variations of this argument, have been officially identified as legally frivolous Federal tax return positions for purposes of the $5,000 frivolous tax return penalty imposed under Internal Revenue Code section 6702(a).

Alleged immunity or exemptions for minority groups
Arguments have been made asserting that members of certain historically disadvantaged minority groups are not obliged to pay taxes. Such arguments have been made, and rejected, with respect to African Americans, Native Americans, and native Hawaiians. Similar arguments have been made in countries other than the United States. For example, such an argument was rejected in the case of a Māori citizen seeking to avoid payment of taxes in New Zealand.

Civil liability
With respect to the failure to pay U.S. federal income tax, some tax protesters miss the distinction between civil and criminal liability. A verdict of acquittal in a criminal trial for non-payment of income tax does not relieve a defendant of civil liability (i.e., the legal obligation to pay the tax). After a criminal acquittal, the IRS can continue to seek money through levy or other lawful means. Generally, the amount of money due to the IRS is determined administratively by the IRS, and not in a criminal trial. (The amount of tax may, however, be calculated after the guilty verdict is reached in a criminal case—for purposes of determining the severity of the sentence.) Although there have been several well-publicized cases of acquittal in a criminal tax case, the IRS continues collection efforts, with many defendants finally seeking refuge in bankruptcy court.

A related concept is that under American jurisprudence, different standards of proof are required in civil and criminal proceedings. Normally, to be convicted of a crime, the defendant must have had a specific mens rea, or guilty mental state. For criminal violations of the income tax law, this generally means that the prohibited conduct (whether failure to file, failure to pay, or engaging in some affirmative act to evade the tax), must have been accompanied by an intentional violation of a legal duty of which the defendant was aware. By contrast, to establish civil liability to pay the tax, no mens rea on the part of the defendant is required to be proven.

See also
 America: Freedom to Fascism, a film directed by Aaron Russo
 Freeman on the land
 Frivolous litigation
 Pseudolaw
 Redemption movement
 Sovereign citizen movement
 Tax protester history in the United States
 Tax resistance
 United States Federal Income Tax Personal Exemption
 Zeitgeist, the Movie''

Notes

Tax resistance in the United States
Conspiracy theories in the United States
Patriot movement
Pseudolaw